National Weather Service Des Moines, currently based in Johnston, Iowa, is a weather forecast office serving the greater Des Moines, Iowa region as part of the National Weather Service.

References

External links
NWS Des Moines Main Page
NOAA Weather Radio Coverage Maps

Des Moines
Organizations based in Des Moines, Iowa